Kanzer (also Romanized as Kanz̄er; also known as Ganz̄ar, Ganzer, Geyānzīr, and Gianzir) is a village in Masal Rural District, in the Central District of Masal County, Gilan Province, Iran. At the 2006 census, its population was 381, in 89 families.

References 

Populated places in Masal County